Alexandra Ahnger (15 May 1859 — 9 September 1940) was a Finnish opera singer (mezzo-soprano) and pedagogue, notable as a leading teacher of voice in her time in Finland.

Early life and education
Alexandra Ahnger was born in Kuopio to Colonel Oscar Ahnger, who later became the Chief of Police of Viipuri, and Alexandrine  von Koberwein. Her older brother, Constantin Ahnger, became a notable entomologist.

She followed this with further studies in Europe, first in Dresden (1885—1888) under Eugen and Anna Hildach, who subsequently also visited Finland to give a joint concert together with Ahnger, and later in Paris where she on occasions between 1890 and 1906 received instruction from Désirée Artôt and Eugénie Vergin (aka. Élise Colonne), among others. She also made a study trip to Milan in 1924.

Career

Singer

She also sang the role of Magdalena, in the Opera of Finland (now the Finnish National Opera) production of Kienzl's Der Evangelimann, staged at the Finnish National Theatre in March 1914 and conducted by Oskar Merikanto, to mark the 40th anniversary of the first fully-staged opera performance in Finland.

Ahnger performed as soloist in many oratorios and choral works, especially ones conducted by Robert Kajanus; these included most notably Beethoven's 9th Symphony and Missa solemnis, Schumann's Paradise and the Peri, and Liszt's Christus.

She also sang in concerts by Armas Järnefelt and others, and notably premiered Sibelius's Lied Demanten på marssnö in February 1901, accompanied on the piano by Oskar Merikanto.

Ahnger is only known to have recorded once, a collection of Lieds by Sibelius, Merikanto and others; this took place in November 1904, making it one of the first recordings in Finland.

Teacher
Alongside her singing career, Ahnger also began teaching singing privately as early as 1888, as well as holding positions as music teacher in various Helsinki schools.

She was later appointed teacher of voice at the Helsinki Institute of Music, where she served for over twenty years, from 1906 to 1927. Due to that role especially, she is considered one of the leading Finnish singing pedagogues of the early 20th century.

References

Finnish mezzo-sopranos
19th-century Finnish women opera singers
People from Kuopio
1859 births
1940 deaths
20th-century Finnish women opera singers